The stone ship or ship setting was an early burial custom in Scandinavia, Northern Germany, and the Baltic states. The grave or cremation burial was surrounded by slabs or stones in the shape of a boat or ship. The ships vary in size and were erected from c. 1000BCE to 1000CE.

History
Stone ships were an early burial custom, characteristically Scandinavian but also found in Northern Germany and the Baltic states. The grave or cremation burial was surrounded by tightly or loosely fit slabs or stones in the outline of a ship. They are often found in grave fields, but are sometimes far from any other archaeological remains.

Ship settings are of varying sizes, some of monumental proportions. The orientation also varies. Inside, they can be cobbled or filled with stones, or have raised stones in the positions of masts. The illusion of being ships has often been reinforced by larger stones at the ends. Some have an oblique stern.

Scattered examples are found in Northern Germany and along the coast of the Baltic States. Excavations have shown that they are usually from the latter part of the Nordic Bronze Age, c. 1000BCE – 500BCE (e.g. Gotland) or from the Germanic Iron Age, the Vendel Period and the Viking Age (e.g. Blekinge and Scania).

Scholars have suggested both that the stone ship developed out of the desire to equip the dead with everything he had in life, and alternatively that it was specifically associated with the journey to Hel. One puzzling feature is that they sometimes occur at the base of a barrow, enclosing a flat area presumably intended for public ceremonies.

In a paper published in 2012, Joseph S. Hopkins and Haukur Þorgeirsson propose a connection between stone ships and the image of a 'ship in a field' that the goddess Freyja's afterlife locations Fólkvangr and Sessrúmnir produce when considered together. According to Hopkins and Haukur, "'A ship in the field' in the mythical realm may have been conceived as a reflection of actual burial customs and vice versa. It is possible that the symbolic ship was thought of as providing some sort of beneficial property to the land, such as good seasons and peace brought on by Freyr’s mound burial in Ynglinga saga."

Notable stone ships

Denmark

 Bække, Denmark. 800 m north of Bække there is a  ship which dates to the Viking Age.
 Jelling stone ship. Under the southern mound in Jelling, Denmark, which is associated with Queen Thyra, remains of a giant Viking Age stone ship have been found, by far the largest known: either .
 Kerteminde fjord, Denmark, a  ship which dates to the Viking Age.
 Lejre, Denmark. An approximately  ship of 28 stones. The ship was cleared in 1921 by a landowner, but some local people interested in history succeeded in saving the stones. Viking Age.
 Lindholm Høje near Aalborg, Denmark. The highest concentration of well-preserved stone ships.
Glavendrup stone contains the longest rune text in Denmark and is a part of a stone ship located in Glavendruplunden in Northern Funen. The stone ship was built around a Bronze Age tumulus.

Germany

 Altes Lager (Menzlin) near Anklam, Western Pomerania, Germany. The stone ships date back to the 9th century.

Sweden

 Ale's Stones is a stone ship in southernmost Sweden.
In the same area there are several smaller stone ships.
It is, however, the most remarkable one as it is made of 24 enormous boulders, weighing about 25 tonnes each.
 Blomsholm stone ships. There are several other large megaliths in the area.
 Gettlinge grave field, Öland, Sweden.
 Hulterstad grave field, Öland, Sweden includes a total of 170 burial locations.
 Tjelvar's Grave (image) in Boge, according to legend the grave of Gotland's mythical discoverer Thjelvar, dated c. 750BCE.

Estonia
 Väo stone ship, which had been covered by later stone cist graves.

Latvia

 "Velna laivas" (Devils' ships) mainly in Talsu novads (northern Courland), dated c. 950–750 BCE.

See also

 Stone circle (Iron Age)
 Menhir
 Ship burial
 Solar barge

References

Germanic archaeological sites
Scandinavian history
Archaeology of Sweden
Iron Age Europe
Archaeoastronomy
Megalithic monuments
Burial monuments and structures
Nordic Bronze Age